Andrea Barzini (born 14 December 1952) is an Italian film and television director, screenwriter and producer. He is the son of Italian journalist and politician Luigi Barzini Jr. and the father of Italian writer Chiara Barzini.

Filmography

 Desiderando Giulia (1986)
 Italia-Germania 4-3 (1990)
 Volevamo essere gli U2 (1992)
 Passo a due (2005)

Television

 Flipper (1983)
 Chiara e gli altri (1989)
 Il sassofono (1991)
 Hotel Alexandria (1999)
 Don Matteo (2001-2004)
 Io e mamma (2007)
 Capri (2007)
 Ho sposato uno sbirro (2010)

References

External links

1952 births
Living people
Italian film directors
Place of birth missing (living people)